Traverse may refer to:

 Traverse (climbing), skiing, and in the engineering of roads into slopes
 Traverse (surveying), a method of establishing basic points in the field
 Movement of a machine slide on a machine tool
 Traverse stage, a style of theatre seating or performance

Other meanings:

 TRAVERSE (software), accounting and business software
 Traverse (gunnery), the horizontal field of fire of an artillery piece
 Traverse (trench warfare), a development in trench design
 Traverse (fortification), a mass of earth behind a military parapet
 Traverse (magazine), a Northern Michigan regional monthly
 Chevrolet Traverse, a 2009 sport-utility vehicle
 Traverse County, Minnesota, a county in Minnesota
 Traverse City, Michigan
 Traverse, Michigan, an unincorporated community
 Traverse Theatre, writing theatre in Scotland
 Traverse Town, a fictional city in some Kingdom Hearts series video games
 Traverse (common law), a pleading which alleges that a fact previously alleged by an adversary is untrue or is made without adequate knowledge

See also 
 Traverser (disambiguation)